Bom Jardim is a municipality located in the Brazilian state of Rio de Janeiro. Its population was 27,616 (2020) and its area is 385 km².

The municipality contains part of the Central Rio de Janeiro Atlantic Forest Mosaic, created in 2006.

References 

Municipalities in Rio de Janeiro (state)